Arberg is a municipality in the district of Ansbach in Bavaria in Germany.

See also
Odilo Weeger

References

Ansbach (district)